Discount Tire Company is an independent tire and wheel retailer. Discount Tire operates in most of the lower 48 states in the United States, and is the largest independent tire and wheel retailer in the world. The company is headquartered in Scottsdale, Arizona.

Company history
Discount Tire was founded in 1960, in Ann Arbor, Michigan, by Bruce T. Halle.  The company grew to over 200 stores by 1990 and opened its 500th store in 2002. On September 10, 2018, Discount Tire opened its 1000th store in Phoenix, Arizona. Discount Tire entered the northeast market with a location in Pittsburgh, Pennsylvania, in February 2020; it as grown from a small business into the largest retailer of tires and wheels in the world. 

Discount Tire is no longer owned by Bruce Halle, but is now owned by Reinalt-Thomas Corp. Halle was the first CEO, followed by Tom Englert, followed by Michael Zuieback, who assumed the CEO position in January 2015. 

In the spring of 2021, Discount Tire started selling  windshield wiper blades, its first product sold other than tires or wheels.

Discount Tire announced its acquisition of Tire Rack in December 2021.

Marketing
In 2005, Discount Tire's "Thank You" commercial entered the Guinness World Records as longest continuously running TV commercial. This commercial depicts an old woman played by Maxine Olmstead hurling a tire through a Discount Tire store window as the voiceover says, "If ever you’re not satisfied with one of our tires, please feel free to bring it back. Thank you." The ad first aired in 1975.

Discount Tire sponsors the number-2 Ford Mustang driven by Austin Cindric  in the NASCAR Cup Series. It also sponsors Monster Energy AMA Supercross.

Regional names
Discount Tire is known as America's Tire in Northern and Central California, along with the Greater Los Angeles area and the Coachella Valley.  In Southern California, this name is used because of the pre-existence of an unrelated 36-store Discount Tire and Service Centers chain.  In the Bay Area,  America's Tire is used because of the pre-existence of an independent tire shop known as Discount Tire suburb of Concord. In San Diego County, the company operates as Discount Tire.  The company also operates as Discount Tire in Ohio and surrounding states despite the existence of the rival Tire Discounters chain. Despite the similar names, the two chains are unrelated.

See also

 Bruce T. Halle Library

References

Automotive part retailers of the United States
Companies based in Scottsdale, Arizona
American companies established in 1960
Retail companies established in 1960
1960 establishments in Michigan